Saxbys is an Australian soft drink brand founded in Sydney, Australia in 1864 by George Saxby.

See also

List of oldest companies in Australia

References

External links

Drink companies of Australia
Companies based in Queensland
Australian companies established in 1864
Soft drinks manufacturers
Food and drink companies established in 1864